Maireana obrienii  is  a shrub that is endemic to eastern Australia.

The species was formally described in 2013, based on plant material collected from Pine Grove, near Mitiamo, Victoria.

References

obrienii
Plants described in 2013
Flora of New South Wales
Flora of Queensland
Flora of Victoria (Australia)
Taxa named by Neville Grant Walsh